Madhav V. Rajan is an Indian-American professor and academic administrator. He is the dean of the Booth School of Business at the University of Chicago.

Early life
Madhav V. Rajan graduated from the University of Madras in India in 1984. Rajan earned a master of science in Accounting in 1987, followed by a master of science in Industrial Administration in 1989, and a PhD in Accounting in 1990, all from Carnegie Mellon University. In 1990, his dissertation won the Alexander Henderson Award for Excellence in Economic Theory.

Career
Rajan was an assistant professor at the Wharton School of the University of Pennsylvania from 1990 to 1996, and tenured associate professor from 1996 to 2000. In 2000, Madhav won the David W. Hauck Award, the highest undergraduate teaching award at Wharton. He joined the Stanford Graduate School of Business in 2001. He subsequently became the Robert K. Jaedicke Professor of Accounting. He also served as its senior associate dean for academic affairs from 2010 to 2016. In 2017, Madhav won the Robert T. Davis Faculty Award for a lifetime of achievement and service to the Stanford GSB.

Rajan succeeded Sunil Kumar as the new dean of the Booth School of Business at the University of Chicago on July 1, 2017.

Madhav is coauthor of Cost Accounting: A Managerial Emphasis, whose 15th edition was published by Pearson Prentice Hall in January 2014. He is also coauthor of Managerial Accounting, whose first edition was published by Pearson in January 2013.  He has published academic articles in journals like the Review of Accounting Studies, the Journal of Accounting and Economics, Management Science, Journal of Accounting Research.

Rajan has served on the board of directors of Cavium since March 2013. He also serves on the board of iShares
and the Investment Advisory Board of CM Capital.

Works

References

Living people
Indian emigrants to the United States
University of Madras alumni
Carnegie Mellon University alumni
Wharton School of the University of Pennsylvania faculty
Stanford University Graduate School of Business faculty
University of Chicago Booth School of Business faculty
Indian corporate directors
Business school deans
Indian academic administrators
Year of birth missing (living people)